Asiola is a genus of robber flies in the family Asilidae. There are at least four described species in Asiola.

Species
These four species belong to the genus Asiola:
 Asiola atkinsi Daniels, 1977 c g
 Asiola blasio (Walker, 1849) c g
 Asiola fasciata Daniels, 1977 c g
 Asiola lemniscata Daniels, 1977 c g
Data sources: i = ITIS, c = Catalogue of Life, g = GBIF, b = Bugguide.net

References

Further reading

External links

 
 

Asilidae genera
Asilinae